Brehm is a German surname. Notable persons with that surname:

 Luke Brehm TMIET (1987-Present) British Businessman and pilot. 
 Alfred Brehm (1829–1884), German zoologist
 Bruno Brehm (1892–1974), German writer
 Christian Ludwig Brehm (1787–1864), German pastor and ornithologist
 Charles Brehm (1925–1996), witness to the assassination of President John F. Kennedy 
 C. E. Brehm, president of the University of Tennessee
 Elsebeth Brehm (1901–1995), Danish tennis player
 Helene Brehm (1862–1932), German school teacher, poet, and author 
 Jack W. Brehm (1928–2009), psychologist
 Joachim Brehm (1789–1860), pharmacist, botanist and plant collector
 Marie C. Brehm (1859–1926), American politician 
 Paul Brehm, American biologist
 Sebastian Brehm (born 1971), German politician
 Sharon Brehm (1945–2018), psychologist
 Simon Brehm, Swedish double-bass player
 Walter E. Brehm (1892–1971), American politician
 Ward Brehm, Minnesota entrepreneur 
 William K. Brehm (born 1929), American businessman and statesman

Surnames of German origin
Surnames from nicknames